Ricky Donell Minard Jr. (born September 11, 1982) is an American professional basketball player who plays for Tampereen Pyrintö of the Korisliiga. He is Morehead State's career scoring leader.

Professional career
He was selected by the Sacramento Kings in the 2nd round (48th overall) of the 2004 NBA Draft. A 6'4" guard from Morehead State University, Minard was signed by the Kings in July 2004, but they waived him in November the same year, and so far he has never appeared in an NBA game.

Minard started his professional career with Columbus Riverdragons of the NBDL. In January 2005, he left the United States and moved to Italy where he spent next five years playing for Lauretana Biella, Bipop Carire Reggio Emilia, Premiata Montegranaro and Lottomatica Roma.

On March 12, 2010, he signed with Khimki Moscow Region of Russia for the rest of the season. For the 2010–11 season he stayed in Russia but moved to UNICS Kazan. On July 20, 2011, he signed a one-year deal with Azovmash Mariupol of Ukraine. On February 17, 2012, he was released by Azovmash. The same day he signed with Novipiu Casale of Italy for the rest of the season.

On August 28, 2012, he signed with Virtus Bologna of Italy. On February 21, 2012, he left Bologna and signed with Beşiktaş of Turkey for the rest of the season. On July 25, 2013, he signed with Budivelnyk Kyiv of Ukraine for the 2013–14 season.

On January 18, 2015, he signed with French team SPO Rouen Basket. On March 7, 2015, he parted ways with Rouen after appearing in five league games.

On August 20, 2015, he signed with BG Göttingen of Germany. On October 23, 2015, he parted ways due to injury with Göttingen after appearing in two games. On November 13, 2015, he signed with Tampereen Pyrintö of the Finnish Korisliiga. Pyrintö advanced to Korisliiga Finals, where they lost to Kouvot. Following their mutual interest already from the previous season the parties re-signed on August 15, 2016.

Notes

External links
 NBA.com Draft bio
 Interview
 FIBA.com profile
 Who is Ricky Minard?
 Eurobasket.com profile

1982 births
Living people
A.S. Junior Pallacanestro Casale players
American expatriate basketball people in Finland
American expatriate basketball people in France
American expatriate basketball people in Germany
American expatriate basketball people in Italy
American expatriate basketball people in Russia
American expatriate basketball people in Turkey
American expatriate basketball people in Ukraine
American men's basketball players
Basketball players from Ohio
BC Azovmash players
BC Budivelnyk players
BC Khimki players
BC UNICS players
BG Göttingen players
Beşiktaş men's basketball players
Columbus Riverdragons players
Morehead State Eagles men's basketball players
Pallacanestro Biella players
Pallacanestro Reggiana players
Pallacanestro Virtus Roma players
Sacramento Kings draft picks
Shooting guards
Small forwards
Sportspeople from Mansfield, Ohio
Sutor Basket Montegranaro players
Tampereen Pyrintö players
Virtus Bologna players